Daddy Bazuaye (born 11 December 1990 in Lagos) is a Nigerian football player currently with Warri Wolves.

Career 
Bazuaye began his career with Bendel Insurance F.C. and moved in 2006 on loan to AS Monaco where he played 6 games for reserve. He returned to Nigeria and was in 2007 transferred to Enyimba International. He now resides in the United States.

International
Bazuaye was member of the Nigerian team at the 2005 FIFA World Youth Championship in the Netherlands he played 5 games.

Titles 
 Vice World Cup winner by 2005 FIFA World Youth Championship with Nigeria.

References

External links
 FIFA

1988 births
Living people
Nigerian footballers
Nigeria under-20 international footballers
Association football midfielders
Enyimba F.C. players
AS Monaco FC players
Bendel Insurance F.C. players
Nigerian expatriate footballers
Expatriate soccer players in South Africa
Expatriate footballers in Monaco
Nigerian expatriate sportspeople in Monaco